Peinnegon is a village in Kyain Seikgyi Township, Kawkareik District, in the Kayin State of Myanmar. It is located approximately 3 kilometres north-east of Kyeikdon.

References

External links
 "Peinnegon Map – Satellite Images of Peinnegon" Maplandia World Gazetteer
 

Populated places in Kayin State